Pemba District is a district of Southern Province, Zambia. It was separated from Choma District in 2012.

References 

Districts of Southern Province, Zambia